The Copa del Rey 1908 was the 6th staging of the Copa del Rey, the Spanish football cup competition. It started and ended on 12 April.

Athletic Bilbao refused to enter to protest the behaviour of Madrid supporters at some games of the previous tournament. Other teams invited, like the Catalan champion X Sporting Club, declined the invitation for economic reasons. Ultimately, only two teams were entered: Madrid FC and Real Vigo Sporting.

The tournament was won by Madrid FC, who claimed their fourth Cup title in a row. They beat Vigo Sporting 2–1 in the final thanks to goals from Antonio Neyra and Federico Revuelto.

Final

References

External links
rsssf.com
 linguasport.com

1908
1908 domestic association football cups
1907–08 in Spanish football